Mount Worthington is located on the border of Alberta and British Columbia on the Continental Divide. It was named in 1956 after Lt. Col. Don Worthington who was killed in action in 1944 during the Second World War while commanding the 7th Battalion, The British Columbia Regiment.

See also
 List of peaks on the Alberta–British Columbia border
 Mountains of Alberta
 Mountains of British Columbia

References

Worthington
Worthington
Worthington